The 2021 J.League Cup, known as the 2021 J.League YBC Levain Cup for sponsorship reasons, was the 29th edition of J.League Cup, a Japanese association football cup competition. It began on 2 March 2021 and ended on 30 October that year.

FC Tokyo were the cup holders, having won their third title. They failed to defend their title after being eliminated by eventual winners Nagoya Grampus in the semi-finals. Nagoya Grampus won their first ever J.League Cup title, defeating one-time winners Cerezo Osaka in the final.

Format 
All 20 teams playing in the 2021 J1 League participated. Four clubs involved in the 2021 AFC Champions League received byes for the group and playoff stages: Kawasaki Frontale, Gamba Osaka, Nagoya Grampus, and Cerezo Osaka.

Sixteen teams played in the group stage. They were divided into four groups of four teams by their finish on the 2020 J1 and J2 Leagues (parenthesized below).

 Group A: Kashima Antlers (J1 5th), Consadole Sapporo (J1 12th), Sagan Tosu (J1 13th), Avispa Fukuoka (J2 2nd).
 Group B: FC Tokyo (J1 6th), Oita Trinita (J1 11th), Vissel Kobe (J1 14th), Tokushima Vortis (J2 1st).
 Group C: Kashiwa Reysol (J1 7th), Urawa Red Diamonds (J1 10th), Yokohama FC (J1 15th), Shonan Bellmare (J1 18th).
 Group D: Sanfrecce Hiroshima (J1 8th), Yokohama F. Marinos (J1 9th), Shimizu S-Pulse (J1 16th), Vegalta Sendai (J1 17th).

Schedule

Group stage
Each group were played on a home-and-away round-robin basis. Each match were played in 90 minutes.

All times listed are in Japan Standard Time (JST, UTC+9).

Tiebreakers
In the group stage, teams in a group were ranked by points (3 points for a win, 1 point for a draw, 0 points for a loss). If the points were tied, the following tiebreakers were applied accordingly:

 Points in head-to-head matches among tied teams;
 Goal difference in head-to-head matches among tied teams;
 Goals scored in head-to-head matches among tied teams;
 Away goals scored in head-to-head matches among tied teams;
 If more than two teams are tied, and applying all head-to-head criteria above remains a part of teams still tied, reapply the criteria above only for the tied teams.
 Goal difference in all group matches;
 Goals scored in all group matches;
 Penalty shoot-out if only two teams are tied and they met in the last round of the group;
 Fewer disciplinary points;
 Drawing of lots.

Group A

Group B

Group C

Group D

Play-off stage

Summary
The play-off stage was played as two-legged ties of two teams each. The away goals rule, an extra time (away goals rule not applied for the scores in the extra time), and a penalty shoot-out would have been used if needed.

The play-off stage was held over two legs; on 2, 5, and 6 June 2021 (first), and 6 and 13 June 2021 (second). All times listed are in Japan Standard Time (JST, UTC+9).

|}

Matches

Kashima Antlers won 3–1 on aggregate.

FC Tokyo won 4–2 on aggregate.

Consadole Sapporo won 4–2 on aggregate.

Urawa Red Diamonds won 4–3 on aggregate.

Prime stage (Knockout stage) 
The prime stage (knockout stage) was played between four teams which won at the play-off stage and the four 2021 AFC Champions League participants entering the tournament at this stage. The prime stage was played as two-legged ties of two teams each. The away goals rule, an extra time (away goals rule not applied for the scores in the extra time), and a penalty shoot-out were used if needed.

The quarter-finals and the semi-finals were played as two-legged ties (same as the play-off stage). The final was played as a single game.

Quarter-finals

Summary
The quarter-finals were held over two legs; on 1 (first) and 5 September 2021 (second). All times listed are in Japan Standard Time (JST, UTC+9).

|}

Matches

FC Tokyo won 3–2 on aggregate.

Nagoya Grampus won 4–0 on aggregate.

Cerezo Osaka won 4–1 on aggregate.

4–4 on aggregate. Urawa Red Diamonds won on away goals.

Semi-finals

Summary
The semi-finals were held over two legs; on 6 (first) and 10 October 2021 (second). All times listed are in Japan Standard Time (JST, UTC+9).

|}

Matches

Nagoya Grampus won 4–3 on aggregate.

Cerezo Osaka won 2–1 on aggregate.

Final

Top scorers

References

External links 
J.League official website

J.League Cup
2021 in Japanese football
2021 Asian domestic association football cups